Łączna may refer to the following places in Poland:
Łączna, Kłodzko County in Lower Silesian Voivodeship (south-west Poland)
Łączna, Wałbrzych County in Lower Silesian Voivodeship (south-west Poland)
Łączna, Świętokrzyskie Voivodeship (south-central Poland)
Łączna, Warmian-Masurian Voivodeship (north Poland)